Jeroen de Vries (born 16 July 1971, Sint Nicolaasga?) is a Dutch marathon speed skater.

As of 2006, De Vries has won eight marathons on artificial speed skating tracks, including one during the 2006 Six Days of the Greenery. In 2005, he won the Alternative Elfstedentocht at the Weissensee in 5:13.57 hours.

References

1971 births
Living people
Dutch male speed skaters
People from Skarsterlân
Place of birth missing (living people)
Sportspeople from Friesland